Shahrak-e Sanati-ye Alborz (also Romanized as Shahrak-e Şan‘atī-ye Alborz) is a village in Pir Yusefian Rural District, in the Central District of Alborz County, Qazvin Province, Iran. At the 2006 census, its population was 686, in 209 families.

References 

Populated places in Alborz County